The 2007 DFS Classic was a women's tennis tournament played on grass courts at the Edgbaston Priory Club in Birmingham in the United Kingdom that was part of Tier III of the 2007 WTA Tour. It was the 26th edition of the tournament was held from 11 June until 17 June 2007. Second-seeded Jelena Janković won the singles title.

Finals

Singles

 Jelena Janković defeated  Maria Sharapova 4–6, 6–3, 7–5
 It was Janković's 4th title of the year and the 6th of her career.

Doubles

 Yung-jan Chan /  Chia-jung Chuang defeated  Tiantian Sun /  Meilen Tu 7–6(7–3), 6–3
 It was Chan's 2nd title of the year and the 3rd of her career. It was Chuang's 2nd title of the year and the 3rd of her career.

External links
 WTA Tournament Profile

DFS Classic
Birmingham Classic (tennis)
DFS Classic
DFS Classic